Hadres is a town in the district of Hollabrunn in Lower Austria, Austria.

Geography
Hadres lies in the Pulkau valley in the  Weinviertel in Lower Austria. About 8.99 percent of the municipality is forested.

References

Cities and towns in Hollabrunn District